Ildikó Bangóné Borbély (born on 29 March 1972) is a Hungarian politician. She currently serves as a member of National Assembly of Hungary (Országgyűlés). She had earlier served as Member of Parliament for the Hungarian Socialist Party in 2014.

References

See also 

 List of members of the National Assembly of Hungary (2018–2022)

1972 births
Living people
21st-century Hungarian politicians
Hungarian Socialist Party politicians
Members of the National Assembly of Hungary (2014–2018)
Members of the National Assembly of Hungary (2018–2022)
Women members of the National Assembly of Hungary